Main Street Bridge is a historic stone arch bridge located at Rochester in Monroe County, New York. It was  constructed in 1857 and spans the Genesee River.

History

Previous structures
The first bridge on this position, constructed on wooden piers, was built in 1810–12. The roadway was level with the east bank, meaning that the bridge had to be reached via a ramp from the lower west bank. This bridge was replaced in 1824. Over the first few years of the second bridge's existence, buildings began to be constructed along the bridge, a situation legally  permitted due to fact that the river is not navigable at this point. An early directory described  it as consisting of  an open platform, adjoining the bridge, of 20 feet, designed for a vegetable market; next, a raised platform, in a range with and corresponding to the sidewalks of Buffalo and Main-streets, of which the market will serve as a continuation. Next to this, is the covered meat market, having in the center a walk of 12 feet wide, between two rows of turned columns, and on either side, the places for stalls, each 10 by 14 feet. 

By 1830  almost the whole north side of the bridge was occupied by buildings. Those resting entirely on the bridge were  made of wood, but there  was a four-story structure called the Globe Building at the east end, resting only partly on the bridge. Housing small manufacturing workshops, it had waterwheels housed beneath it. The south side of the bridge remained open. The wooden buildings  were destroyed by fire in January 1834. They were, except for the market, soon rebuilt, but a flood in October of the next year removed them again. The flood damage also made the rebuilding of the bridge desirable, and a new structure was begun in 1837. Plans for a stone bridge were dropped, but two stone piers were built and the eastern abutment was raised to lessen the gradient up Main Street hill.

Present structure

Work on the present stone structure began in September 1855, and it was opened in August 1857, although a considerable amount of work remained to be done. Construction of shops on the north side began almost immediately, this time in stone rather than wood, and supported on extensions to the bridge piers and river walls. The bridge was widened on the south side in 1861–2, and buildings started to be constructed on the south side in 1865. The buildings were removed in the mid-1960s.

The bridge was listed on the National Register of Historic Places in 1984.

See also
 National Register of Historic Places listings in Rochester, New York
 List of bridges documented by the Historic American Engineering Record in New York (state)

References

External links

Bridges in Rochester, New York
Road bridges on the National Register of Historic Places in New York (state)
Historic American Engineering Record in New York (state)
Bridges completed in 1857
National Register of Historic Places in Rochester, New York
1857 establishments in New York (state)
Stone arch bridges in the United States